Samuel Frye (or Frie) House is a historic First Period house in North Andover, Massachusetts.  Tradition places its construction between 1711, when a previous house on the site burned down, and 1719, when Frye gave the property, with house, to his son.  The house was in the Frye family until 1880.  It is a -story wood-frame house, one room deep and five bays wide, with a rear leanto section that was added in the 19th century.  The house is notable for its retention of a tradition two room form despite the removal of its central chimney during Federal period renovations.

The property was listed on the National Register of Historic Places in 1990.

See also
National Register of Historic Places listings in Essex County, Massachusetts
List of the oldest buildings in Massachusetts

References

Houses in North Andover, Massachusetts
Houses on the National Register of Historic Places in Essex County, Massachusetts